Xhanfise Keko (27 January 1928 – 22 December 2007), born in Gjirokastër, Albania, was an Albanian film director.

Keko was one of the seven founders of "New Albania" Film Studio, present day "Albafilm-Tirana". She was the first female director and directed some 25 different movies  between 1952 and 1984 including the 1975 film, Beni Walks by Himself and Tomka and His Friends, both awarded at the Giffoni International Film Festival. Her films were generally targeted toward younger audiences but contemporary critics praise her "sensitive approach to her material, a technical facility outstripping her contemporaries and a highly original voice".

She was the mother of well-known Albanian writer Teodor Keko.

Filmography
Taulanti kërkon një motër (1984)
Një vonesë e vogël (1982)
Kur xhirohej një film (1981)
Partizani i vogël Velo (1980)
Pas gjurmëve (1978)
Tomka and His Friends (1977)
Malësorët pas komisarëve (1976)
Tinguj lufte (1976)
Beni Walks by Himself (1975)
Për popullin, me popullin (1975)
Reportazh nga Tropoja (1975)
Qyteti më i ri në botë (1974)
Mimoza llastica (1973)
Kongresi i 6 PPSH (1972)
Kryengritje në pallat (1972)
Shkolla tingujt ngjyra (1972)
ABC...ZH (1971)
Nga festivali artistik i fëmijve (1969)
Kalitemi nepërmjet aksioneve (1968)
Lart flamujt e aksioneve (1968)
Ato çajnë përpara (1967)
Gra heroike shqiptare përpara (1967)
Miqësi e madhe unitet luftarak (1966)
Tregim për njerzit e punës (1963)
Kongresi i 3 i PPSH (1952)

References

1928 births
2007 deaths
People from Gjirokastër
Albanian film directors
Albanian women film directors
Albanian cinematographers
Albanian women cinematographers
Albanian screenwriters
Albanian artists
People's Artists of Albania
20th-century screenwriters